Willie Edward Lanier (born August 21, 1945) is an American former professional football player who was a middle linebacker for the Kansas City Chiefs from 1967 through 1977. He won postseason honors for eight consecutive years, making the American Football League All-Star team in 1968 and 1969 before being selected to the Pro Bowl from 1970 through 1975.

A Super Bowl champion, Lanier won the NFL Man of the Year in 1972. He was selected to both the NFL’s 75th
and 100th Anniversary All-Time Teams, and inducted into the Pro Football Hall of Fame in 1986 and the College Football Hall of Fame in 2000.

Early life
Lanier was born in Clover and attended Maggie L. Walker High School in Richmond, Virginia. According to a DNA analysis, he descended, mainly, from Jola people of Guinea-Bissau.

College career
Lanier played college football at Morgan State University under head coach Earl Banks where he was twice selected to the small-college College Football All-America Team and was also chosen MVP of the Tangerine Bowl.

Willie Lanier is a member of  The Pigskin Club of Washington, D.C.  National Intercollegiate All-American Football Players Honor Roll.

Professional career
On January 15, 1967, the Chiefs lost Super Bowl I to Vince Lombardi's Green Bay Packers by a 35-10 score, forcing head coach Hank Stram to look for defensive players in the upcoming draft. Stram picked the 6’ 1”, 245 lb. Lanier with the 50th overall pick, three picks after another linebacker, Jim Lynch of the Notre Dame Fighting Irish.

Lynch had been chosen to play in the annual College All-Star Game, causing him to miss the first two weeks of Chiefs practice. By the time Lynch made it to camp, Lanier had already established himself as the team's middle linebacker.  He joined Garland Boyette of the AFL's Houston Oilers as the first black middle linebackers in professional American football history. In the midst of a solid first season, Lanier suffered an injury and missed the last four games of the year.

The following year, Lanier collected four interceptions, then matched that total in 1969 as he helped the Chiefs capture Super Bowl IV with a 23-7 upset of the Minnesota Vikings. He was stellar in the Super Bowl, recording 7 tackles and an interception.  He later commented on the increased motivation that Chiefs players felt because of wearing an AFL patch to honor the league's final year.

There were numerous great moments throughout Lanier’s career, but none exemplifies his heart and desire as much as the Chiefs' goal line stand against the New York Jets in the 1969 divisional playoff game. Trailing 6-3 in the fourth quarter, New York had a first-and-goal at the Chiefs' one-yard line after a pass interference call on Kansas City. It was then that Lanier made an emotional appeal to the rest of the Chiefs defense, yelling: "They're not going to score...!  They're not going to score!" The Chiefs shut down the Jets on three straight plays and held them to a field goal. Kansas City scored a touchdown on its next possession, winning the game, and winning a place in the Super Bowl.

The Chiefs reached the NFL playoffs only one more time during Lanier's career, in 1971, winning the AFC Western Division title. On Christmas Day, in the final contest at Municipal Stadium, the Chiefs' season came to an end against the Miami Dolphins in a double overtime classic. The contest was the longest game in NFL history, clocking in at more than 82 minutes.

In 1972, the Chiefs moved to Arrowhead Stadium. By 1974 the team's talent was depleted by age and injuries. After the conclusion of that season, Stram was fired after 15 years at the helm.

The linebacking trio of Lanier, Lynch and fellow Hall of Famer Bobby Bell is recognized as one of the most talented in professional football history, lasting until the arrival of new head coach Paul Wiggin in 1975.

Lanier was traded in April 1978 to the Baltimore Colts, but announced his retirement as an active player three months later on July 20, 1978.

"Contact"

Lanier was known as Contact, a name coined by Chiefs' teammate Jerry Mays in 1967. As Lanier remembered: "Since I unfortunately followed the style of tackling that we were taught at that time – that was to use your head first of hitting players in the middle of their body. It was done in a rather aggressive manner".

But Lanier's uncontrolled tackling resulted in Chiefs' equipment manager Bobby Yarborough outfitting Lanier's helmet with extra padding. The padding was not on the inside of the helmet to protect Lanier but rather, as some photos of him in uniform show, on the outside of the helmet to protect the player he was tackling.

While renowned for his hitting ability, Lanier was also fast, agile and disciplined, finishing his career with 27 interceptions and 15 fumble recoveries.

Honors
Willie Lanier received All-Pro (AFL ALL-Star or All-AFC) mention every year, appearing in all-star games from 1968 to 1975 (his first two in the AFL and his last six in the AFC). In 1986, he achieved Pro Football Hall of Fame status.
1968. Elected to AFL All-Star Game.
1969. Elected to AFL All-Star Game.
1970. Elected to NFLs AFC-NFC Pro Bowl Game.
1971. Elected to NFLs AFC-NFC Pro Bowl Game. Defensive MVP of the league (co-winner).
1972. Elected to NFLs AFC-NFC Pro Bowl Game (MVP-defense of the match). NFLs Walter Payton Man of the Year Award (charitable work as player-citizen).
1973. Elected to NFLs AFC-NFC Pro Bowl Game.
1974. Elected to NFLs AFC-NFC Pro Bowl Game.
1975. Elected to NFLs AFC-NFC Pro Bowl Game.
1985. Chiefs ' Hall of Fame.
1986. Second Chiefs ' player inducted into Pro Football Hall of Fame by the National Football League for the class of this year, at Canton, Ohio. Also in 1986, he was inducted into the Virginia Sports Hall of Fame.
1994. NFL 75th Anniversary All-Time Team.
 In 1999, he was ranked number 42 on The Sporting News''' list of the 100 Greatest Football Players, the highest-ranking Chief.

After the NFL
After Lanier's retirement, the Chiefs retired both Lanier's and Bell's numbers.

Lanier returned to school, taking graduate courses at the University of Missouri–Kansas City. He then returned to Virginia as a stockbroker, at First Union Securities, where he served as vice-chairman. He is the former CEO of TDS/US, the minority venture partner of TDS Logistics (now Syncreon).

In 2006, Lanier was interviewed for the NFL Network documentary America's Game: The Super Bowl Champions chronicling the 1969 Kansas City Chiefs season.

Filmography
1974. The Black Six. As Tommy Bunka. Directed by Matt Cimber (Matteo Ottaviano). Drama about racism in a southern town, with six black bikers (The Black Six) avenging the death of a friend. Lanier teamed with other greatest stars of the 1970s (Joe Greene, Carl Eller, Gene Washington, Mercury Morris).
2000. Super Bowl XXXIV (TV). As coin-tosser''.

See also
Other American Football League players

References

External links
 
 
 Morgan State profile

1945 births
Living people
American football middle linebackers
Kansas City Chiefs players
Morgan State Bears football players
American Football League All-Star players
American Conference Pro Bowl players
National Football League players with retired numbers
College Football Hall of Fame inductees
Pro Football Hall of Fame inductees
Stockbrokers
People from Clover, Virginia
Players of American football from Richmond, Virginia
American people of Bissau-Guinean descent
American Football League players
Maggie L. Walker Governor's School for Government and International Studies alumni